Anderson Jacobson, also known for a time as CXR Anderson Jacobson and today as CXR Networks, is a vendor of communications equipment. Anderson Jacobson was an early manufacturer of acoustic modems and was spun off from SRI International (then the Stanford Research Institute). In the 1970s and 1980s, the company manufactured modems, some intended for consumers. The company was acquired by CXR Telecom in 1988, at which time The Times was following Anderson Jacobson's earnings reports. The flow of new products continued.

Today the company is a privately owned communication equipment vendor supplying products to Telecom Carriers, Service Providers, and the Defense, Transport and Utility markets. The company is headquartered in Abondant, France.

History
Anderson Jacobson was primarily a California-based manufacturer of acoustic coupler modems, but they also manufactured printing terminals designed to replace
teletypes.

Modems
Anderson Jacobson began early in 1967 as a manufacturer of one of the first acoustic data couplers. This technical advancement was a step beyond directly wiring to phone lines. By 1973, the company had
acoustic coupler products that transmitted at 150, 300 and 1200 baud.

Terminals

Some of their terminals were CRTs and others were Printer/Keyboard devices.

Historical Table of Anderson Jacobson terminals
Among the terminals that were marketed by Anderson Jacobson are:

CXR
After the merger, industrial references varied, including "Anderson Jacobson (CXR)" 

CXR was purchased by Emrise Corporation an international manufacturer of defense and aerospace electronic devices and subsystems and telecommunications equipment. and, in 2016 sold for 690,000 British pounds to its former chairman/CEO.

CXR, described as "manufactures network telecommunications equipment," was still operating as of 2017, albeit not in the areas for which AJ had begun in 1967.

See also
 SRI International
 List of SRI International spin-offs

References

External links
 AJ/CXR name change 2003 press release

1967 establishments in California
1988 disestablishments in California
1988 mergers and acquisitions
American companies established in 1967
American companies disestablished in 1988
Computer companies established in 1967
Computer companies disestablished in 1988
Computer terminals
Defunct computer companies of the United States
Modems
Networking companies
Telecommunications equipment vendors